The Estonian Young Footballer of the Year is an annual award given to the best Estonian young footballer since 2008.

Winners

References

External links
 

 
Lists of Estonian sportspeople
Estonian sports trophies and awards
Association football player non-biographical articles